Anopheles annularis is a species of mosquito belonging to the genus Anopheles. Larvae found in clean, lotic bodies of water with abundant vegetation. Females are zoophilic, mainly feed blood on cattle and humans. The species is a major malaria vector in India, Nepal and Sri Lanka. It is also an important vector for Plasmodium vivax in Afghanistan.

References

annularis
Insects described in 1884